State Theatre New Jersey is a nonprofit theater, located in New Brunswick, New Jersey. It has seating for 1,850 people. Designed by architect Thomas W. Lamb in 1921, it is one of the oldest theaters in the State of New Jersey.

History
The State Theatre was built in 1921 as Reade's State Theatre by Thomas W. Lamb and managed by Walter Reade for both movies and live performances. It opened with five vaudeville acts and a single matinee screening of the silent western White Oak, starring William S. Hart. Patrons, including first ticket buyer, nine-year-old Victor Levin, paid 20-30 cents per admission.

The theater was placed under the management of Benjamin Franklin Keith and Edward Franklin Albee II of B.F Keith Theatre chain, which then was the largest vaudeville theater chain in the early 1920s. After the death of Keith, Albee continued the operation and eventually merged with Orpheum, the largest western booking agency to form Keith-Albee-Orpheum (KAO).

In 1928, The Radio Corporation of America (RCA) acquired KAO as a subsidiary and KAO changed to Radio-Keith-Orpheum; also known as RKO. Within one year, the theater was equipped for sound.

In 1933 the RKO State Theatre underwent major renovations ending with a RKO Art-Deco renovation. With the advent of talking movies, the theater became a popular cinema for first-run movies beginning in 1939.

In the 1950s RKO State Theatre began to host rock ‘n’ roll shows featuring popular artists like The Satins, Chubby Checker, and more. This emerging genre led to yet another renovation of the theater adding acoustic tiles, which helped produce a booming sound.

In the 1970s, while continuing to host rock 'n' roll shows, the State Theatre drew in considerable audiences by embracing the Rocky Horror Picture Show.

Revitalization

The State Theatre continued to operate into the 1960s until audiences switched to multiplex cinemas. RKO sold the building to a business that showed adult movies and the structure declined. In 1979 it was purchased by the New Brunswick Development Corporation as part of New Brunswick's revitalization project for $455,000.

In 1986, the New Brunswick Cultural Center, led by Chairman Richard B. Sellars, former Chairman and CEO of Johnson & Johnson acquired the State Theatre from the New Brunswick Development Corporation, and in 1987 began a $3 million renovation. The State Theatre reopened as a performing arts center on April 24, 1988 with a performance by the Jerusalem Symphony Orchestra.

In December 2003, with the help of the Middlesex County and Board of County Commissioners, the theater received $3 million for interior restoration. Up to 20 layers of paint were stripped away to determine the original color scheme. The ornamental plaster domed ceiling were repaired, and upgrades were made to the sound and lighting systems.

The theatre re-opened in October 2004 with a performance by comedian Jay Leno. In the summer of 2010, the State Theatre installed a new heating, ventilation, and air conditioning system costing $1 million provided by Middlesex County.

Today, State Theatre New Jersey continues to flourish as the centerpiece and premier venue for New Brunswick, New Jersey arts community. State Theatre presents a diverse roaster of entertainment, including international orchestras, Broadway, comedy, dance, pop, rock, family events, and more.

In addition to presenting mainstage performances, State Theatre New Jersey hosts over 180 education and community engagement programs reaching 30,000 students, teachers, and families each year, with performances, workshops, artist residencies, Sensory friendly performances, and other activities.

As of June 2020, over six million people have come through the doors of the theater.

A new blade marquee was installed during the summer of 2021, as part of major renovations.

Notable events
Artists who have performed at State Theatre New Jersey throughout the years include Ringo Starr, Diana Ross, Harry Connick Jr., David Copperfield, Frankie Valli, Bruce Springsteen, George Carlin, Lewis Black, kd lang, John Leguizamo, Tony Bennett and Aretha Franklin. The State Theatre has also hosted distinguished international orchestras such as the New York Philharmonic, the Philadelphia Orchestra, the Munich Symphony Orchestra, the Mariinsky Orchestra, and the BBC Concert Orchestra, among others.

On May 20, 2009, the State Theatre hosted the last performance by Peter, Paul, and Mary. Due to Mary Travers' long illness and continuing decline, the remaining shows that the trio had planned were either canceled, or only featured Peter Yarrow and Noel "Paul" Stookey. Mary Travers died of complications from chemotherapy on September 16, 2009.

On November 14, 2018 the historic State Theatre New Jersey was the focus of the second episode of NJTV's Treasures of New Jersey.

Timeline
 1921 Opens on December 26 under the theater management of Walter Reade
 1922 State's management is under-taken by B.F Keith Theater chain
 1922-1924 Merges with largest western booking agency, Orpheum, and becomes Keith-Albee-Orpheum
 1933 Major design changes occur, ending with RKO art deco renovation
 1939 RKO letters are added to façade
 1939 With the advent of talking movies, the theater becomes a popular cinema for first-run movies
 1950s State Theatre begins to host rock ‘n’ roll shows
 1960s Growing popularity of television leads to decline in theater audience and the theater's popularity
 1970 The theater is purchased by investor Jeffrey Gerstin and is rebranded with a new identity focused on both foreign and domestic art motion pictures with the hope of drawing in the Rutgers community.
 1970s Under new ownership, the theater hosts big name artists including Meat Loaf, Tina Turner and Harry Chaplin, as well others listed above; the theater also becomes one the first in the state of New Jersey to feature the cult classic, The Rocky Horror Picture Show, often attracting large audiences (oftentimes in costume) for late-night showings.
 1979 New Brunswick Development Corporation acquires property
 1983 Johnson & Johnson holds its first ever off-site Shareholders Meeting at State Theatre New Jersey
 1986 New Brunswick Cultural Center acquires property from the New Brunswick Development Corporation
 1987 Renovation begins
 1988 Reopening on April 24
 2003 Renovation begins in December
 2004 Reopening in October with Jay Leno
 2010 Middlesex County provides $1 million for the installation of a new heating, ventilation, and air conditioning system.
 November 14, 2018 State Theatre New Jersey was the focus of the second episode of NJTV's Treasures of New Jersey.
As of June 2020, over six million people have come through the doors of the theatre.

References

Buildings and structures in New Brunswick, New Jersey
Theatres in New Jersey
1921 establishments in New Jersey
Tourist attractions in New Brunswick, New Jersey
Thomas W. Lamb buildings